Draža or Draza is a given name.

Those bearing it include:

 Draža Mihailović (1893-1946), Yugoslavian ethnic-Serbian general
 Draza Mihajlovic, namesake of Draza Mihajlovic Cup basketball tournament in Australia

See also 
 Dražan